Greg Oliver (born February 2, 1971, in Kitchener, Ontario) is a Canadian sports writer. He currently resides in Toronto, Ontario, Canada.

Early life and education
He earned a Bachelor of Applied Arts in journalism, newspaper major, in 1993 from Ryerson Polytechnic University.

Writing
He is the author of seven books on professional wrestling, and six books on hockey. He is also the co-founder and producer of the Slam Wrestling website, which began as a part of the Sun Media family on the Canoe.ca website. On June 1, 2020, Slam Wrestling ended its association with Postmedia and established SlamWrestling.net.

Oliver has contributed to many other publications, including The Hockey News, Publishers Weekly, The Globe and Mail, The Toronto Sun, Kingston Whig-Standard, Kitchener-Waterloo Record, Atlanta Journal-Constitution, Fighting Spirit Magazine. As a teenager, he published The Canadian Wrestling Report (1985-1990).

Oliver's work has been reviewed by Booklist, Quill and Quire, Publishers Weekly, Winnipeg Free Press, London Free Press, Kitchener-Waterloo Record, New York Journal of Books, and one book, Don't Call Me Goon: Hockey's Greatest Enforcers, Gunslingers, and Bad Boys, made The Globe and Mail Top 10 for non-fiction in October 2013.

The 2017 documentary, Sweet Daddy Siki, about professional wrestler Daddy Siki|Reginald "Sweet Daddy" Siki, was written by Oliver.

In September 2021, it was announced that Oliver is working with Madusa Debrah Miceli on her autobiography, covering her time in wrestling and in monster trucks. It will be out in the spring of 2023 from ECW Press.

Criticism
In July 2008, Bret Hart, spoke at the George Tragos/Lou Thesz Professional Wrestling Hall of Fame, during the induction banquet for his father, Stu Hart, about Oliver. Upset over his ranking in one of Oliver's books – #14 in the greatest Canadian performers, behind midget wrestler Sky Low Low – Hart called Oliver a "charlatan". Sports journalist Heath McCoy also criticized Oliver for his placement of Hart, asking if he was joking with that decision and saying the book was highly biased toward Ontario wrestling.

Works
The Pro Wrestling Hall of Fame: The Canadians (2002) 
The Pro Wrestling Hall of Fame: The Tag Teams (with Steven Johnson) (2005) 
The Pro Wrestling Hall of Fame: The Heels (with Steven Johnson) (2007) 
Benoit: Wrestling with the Horror that Destroyed a Family and Crippled a Sport (with Steven Johnson, Irv Muchnick and Heath McCoy) (2007) 
The Pro Wrestling Hall of Fame: Heroes & Icons (with Steven Johnson) (2012) 
SLAM! Wrestling: Shocking Stories from the Squared Circle (Editor, with Jon Waldman) (2012) 
Written in Blue and White: The Toronto Maple Leafs Contracts and Historical Documents from the Collection of Allan Stitt (2014)  
The Goaltenders' Union: Hockey's Greatest Puckstoppers, Acrobats, and Flakes (with Richard Kamchen) (2014)  
Don't Call Me Goon: Hockey's Greatest Enforcers, Gunslingers, and Bad Boys (with Richard Kamchen) (2015)  
Duck with the Puck (with Quinn Oliver) (2015)  
Blue Lines, Goal Lines & Bottom Lines: Hockey Contracts and Historical Documents from the Collection of Allan Stitt (2016) 
Father Bauer and the Great Experiment: The Genesis of Canadian Olympic Hockey (2017) 
Gratoony the Loony: The Wild, Unpredictable Life of Gilles Gratton (2017) 
Santa's Day Job (2018) 
The Pro Wrestling Hall of Fame: The Storytellers (From the Terrible Turk to Twitter) (with Steven Johnson) (2019) 
Who's The Man? Billy Van! (with Stacey Case) (2020) 
Mat Memories: My Wild Life in Pro Wrestling, Country Music, and with the Mets (with John "Alexander" Arezzi) (2021)

Awards
2021 Bill Fitsell President's Award from the Society for International Hockey Research
2020 James C. Melby Historian Award from the Cauliflower Alley Club
2008 James Melby Memorial Award for wrestling journalism from the George Tragos/Lou Thesz Professional Wrestling Hall of Fame

Personal
He is married to author Meredith Renwick, and he worked on the book, "Duck with the Puck," with their son, Quinn Oliver. His brother, Chris Oliver, is a well-known college basketball coach and instructor.

References

External links
Official website

Canadian sportswriters
1971 births
Writers from Kitchener, Ontario
Living people
Professional wrestling journalists and columnists
Professional wrestling historians